Ferdinand Paul Leo Weinke (born 26 January 1995) is a German field hockey player who plays as a defender for Uhlenhorst Mülheim and the German national team.

He played in the youth ranks of SC Charlottenburg. He joined Uhlenhorst Mülheim in 2014.

International career
Weinke made his debut for the national team in March 2017. In November 2018, he was selected in the Germany squad for the 2018 World Cup. He also represented Germany at the 2019 European Championship.

Honours
Germany (indoor)
EuroHockey Indoor Championship: 2016

Uhlenhorst Mülheim
Bundesliga: 2017–18, 2018–19
Indoor Bundesliga: 2015–16
EuroHockey Indoor Club Cup: 2015, 2017

References

External links
 
 

1995 births
Living people
Male field hockey defenders
German male field hockey players
2018 Men's Hockey World Cup players
HTC Uhlenhorst Mülheim players
Place of birth missing (living people)
Men's Feldhockey Bundesliga players
21st-century German people
2018 FIH Indoor Hockey World Cup players